Görlitz station is the central station of the city of Görlitz in the German state of Saxony. Of the original twelve station tracks only six are still in operation. Görlitz is also served by stations in Rauschwalde, Weinhübel and Hagenwerder.

History 

In 1845, the city began, along with the Lower Silesian-Marcher Railway, the construction of a station building, which opened in 1847 and began the development of modern Görlitz. Hotels, apartments and businesses were later built around the station. Previously, it had been surrounded only by fields. The station was built by the master mason, Gustav Kießler, who also built the Neisse Viaduct.

On 15 October 1846 Görlitz was connected to the railway network in Prussian Silesia, of which Görlitz formed part at that time. The Lower Silesian-Marcher Railway had begun to build its line from Berlin to Breslau in 1843.  of this line ran from Kohlfurt (after 1945 renamed as Węgliniec) to Görlitz. The South-North German Connecting Railway (Süd-Norddeutsche Verbindungsbahn) was already planning a connection between Berlin and Vienna via Görlitz and Seidenberg (renamed after 1945 as Zawidów).

The station of Görlitz, which Prussia had seized from Saxony in 1815, was jointly operated by the Lower Silesian-Marcher Railway and the Saxon-Silesian Railway, railway companies based in the two mentioned nations. The Saxon-Silesian Railway operated the line to Dresden. The city created Bahnhofsstraße as a street access to the station. The first station building was built on island platforms, so that the two railway companies could have separate entrances.

Two slender towers were built at the main entrance, which was protected from the weather by a veranda. From the entrance hall a passage connected to the ticket and luggage offices. This hall was connected by passages to the waiting rooms and trains. A similar building was built by Lower Silesian-Marcher Railway in Kohlfurt.

Görlitz was one of the major cities of Prussia and further extensions were built. A line was built to Berlin via Cottbus, opened in 1867. Traffic grew rapidly and the station became congested. The existing building was built west of the island platforms and a new entrance building was built facing Bahnhofsstrasse. A newly pedestrian tunnel was built leading directly from Bahnhofsstrasse to the extension of the building on the island platforms. All other old railway buildings, including the two towers had to be demolished for the new development. The new building was larger and better equipped than the old station. During the World War I the new building and the adjacent railway post office (1915) were completed. The entrance hall was opened in Art Nouveau style in 1917.

In 1923 Görlitz station was electrified and thus connected to electrified rail network on the Silesian Mountain Railway. Electric rail transport in Görlitz ended in February 1945, due to war-related interruption of overhead lines and power supply. Starting in autumn 1945 the overhead lines were dismantled and transported as reparations to the Soviet Union. Scheduled in 1981 Deutsche Reichsbahn planned the reelectrification of the station to be completed by 1995. However, after 1989 (opening of the East German western borders) the reconstruction of inner-German rail connections gained priority and the electrification of the Dresden-Görlitz Saxon-Silesian railway has been deferred indefinitely.

In 1984, the station hall ceiling was completely restored. The building has since become a historical monument.

Train services 
As of May 2017 The station is served by the following services:

regional express  Dresden – Bischofswerda – Bautzen – Görlitz (– Zgorzelec – Węgliniec – Legnica – Wrocław Gł.)
regional service  Dresden – Bischofswerda – Bautzen – Görlitz
regional service  Bischofswerda – Bautzen – Görlitz
regional service  Hoyerswerda – Görlitz
regional service  Zittau – Görlitz – Weißwasser – Cottbus
regional service  Węgliniec – Zgorzelec – Görlitz – Zgorzelec – Lubań – Jelenia Góra
regional service (Polregio) Goerlitz (Görlitz) - Żary - Zielona Góra Główna 

Görlitz station has border facilities for Poland. Trains used to run three times a day to Legnica and Wrocław from 2009 until February 28, 2015. Cross-border services have been restored in December 2015. Since then there are direct trains to Wrocław Gł., Węgliniec, Legnica and Jelenia Góra.

References

External links 
 

Railway stations in Saxony
Art Nouveau architecture in Germany
Railway stations in Germany opened in 1847
Art Nouveau railway stations
Buildings and structures completed in 1917
station
Station